Dushmantha Mithrapala  is a Sri Lankan politician and a member of the Parliament of Sri Lanka. He was elected from Kegalle District in 2015. He is a Member of the United People's Freedom Alliance. In 2021 he ranked in the 10 least active MPs of the Sri Lankan partliment by manthri.lk.

References

Living people
Members of the 15th Parliament of Sri Lanka
Members of the 16th Parliament of Sri Lanka
Year of birth missing (living people)
Place of birth missing (living people)